The 2011 Autosport 6 Hours of Silverstone was an auto racing event held at the Silverstone Circuit on 11 September 2011. It was the fourth round of the 2011 Le Mans Series season and the fifth round of the 2011 Intercontinental Le Mans Cup.

Qualifying

Qualifying Result
Pole position winners in each class are marked in bold.

Race result
Class winners in bold.  Cars failing to complete 70% of winner's distance marked as Not Classified (NC).

References

Silverstone
6 Hours of Silverstone
Six Hours of Silverstone
Silverstone
September 2011 sports events in the United Kingdom